Traminda mundissima is a species of moth of the family Geometridae. It is found in Bahrain, Oman, the United Arab Emirates, Yemen, India, Thailand, New Calidonia and Australia, where it has been recorded from Western Australia, Queensland and New South Wales.

Adults are brown or green, usually with a dark edged yellow arc across the forewing. The hindwings have an angular tornus.

The larvae feed on Acacia species, including Acacia catechu.

Subspecies
Traminda mundissima mundissima
Traminda mundissima hemichroa Meyrick, 1889
Traminda mundissima submarginata Warren, 1899
Traminda mundissima subvirgata Prout, 1938

References

Moths described in 1861
Cosymbiini